Izar (from the Arabic word  , 'veil') may refer to:

 Izar, Iran, a village in Hormozgan Province, Iran
 , a part of the Ihram clothing worn by male pilgrims during the Islamic Hajj
 Izar, a star, also known as Pulcherrima and Epsilon Boötis
 IZAR, Spanish shipbuilder; sold and renamed Navantia in 2005
 IZAR, product name for the Motorola RAZR V3xx cellular phone